Dejan Batrović (Cyrillic: Дејан Батровић; born 25 October 1971) is a Montenegrin former professional footballer who played as a striker.

Club career
Batrović played for Budućnost Titograd in the 1990–91 Yugoslav First League. He later spent two and a half seasons at Radnički Beograd in the First League of FR Yugoslavia (1993–1995), before transferring abroad to Spanish club Getafe in early 1996. After spending one full season with fellow Segunda División side Ourense, Batrović briefly played for Mexican club León (1997). He subsequently returned to the Iberian Peninsula and joined Xerez in early 1998. During the early 2000s, Batrović played for Zeta in the First League of Serbia and Montenegro (2000–2004).

References

External links
 
 

1971 births
Living people
Footballers from Podgorica
Association football forwards
Yugoslav footballers
Serbia and Montenegro footballers
Montenegrin footballers
FK Budućnost Podgorica players
FK Radnički Beograd players
Getafe CF footballers
CD Ourense footballers
Club León footballers
Xerez CD footballers
FK Rad players
Shandong Taishan F.C. players
FK Zeta players
Yugoslav First League players
First League of Serbia and Montenegro players
Segunda División players
Liga MX players
Chinese Super League players
Serbia and Montenegro expatriate footballers
Expatriate footballers in Spain
Serbia and Montenegro expatriate sportspeople in Spain
Expatriate footballers in Mexico
Serbia and Montenegro expatriate sportspeople in Mexico
Expatriate footballers in China
Serbia and Montenegro expatriate sportspeople in China